Marco Meilinger (born 8 August 1991) is an Austrian footballer who plays as a midfielder.

Club career
He started playing football with USK Anif, a team from a suburb of Salzburg.  In 2002, he went to Austria Salzburg, and 2005, after the club was bought by Red Bull, he played with FC Red Bull Salzburg. In 2009, he played for the second team of Red Bull Salzburg, Red Bull Juniors. He signed with FC Red Bull Salzburg in 2010. In August 2011, he was loaned to SV Ried and had a two-year loan spell at the club. In 2014, he signed with Austria Wien. In 2016 Meilinger signed with the Danish club AaB, ready to try a new country and a new league.

International career
Since 2008 Marco Meilinger played for Austria in different youth teams. In 2010, he played with the U 19 team in the European Championship in France and is qualified with the team for the U 20 World championship in 2011.

References

Spoxx.com Marco Meilinger
Homepage FC Red Bull Salzburg
Homepage Aab Fodbold

External links
 

1991 births
Living people
Footballers from Salzburg
Austria youth international footballers
Austria under-21 international footballers
Association football midfielders
FC Red Bull Salzburg players
SV Ried players
FK Austria Wien players
AaB Fodbold players
SC Rheindorf Altach players
Austrian Football Bundesliga players
Danish Superliga players
Austrian expatriate footballers
Expatriate men's footballers in Denmark
Austrian expatriate sportspeople in Denmark